"Slower" is a song by Canadian singer and songwriter Tate McRae. It was released on March 3, 2021 through RCA Records as the fourth single from McRae's second extended play, Too Young to Be Sad. The song was written by McRae, Nolan Lambroza, Russell Chell, Zack Zadek and Zoe Moss.

Background 
Tate McRae originally released the demo version of the song on her YouTube series 'Create With Tate' with the title "Ew Feelings (Aka Slower)". Speaking to Melinda Fakuade of Nylon, she recalled writing the song at the age of 14 and initially loving it, but being reluctant to release it years later. She noted that once the song was re-recorded and reproduced, it sounded completely different. In an interview with Wonderland she remarked about the song, "It was honestly about a guy who was being super flakey with me and I was fed up with always having to guess with him. It talks about how if he wasn’t going to make up his mind, I was going to move on with my life." When discussing the song with Travis Mills of Apple Music, she mused that the song has taken on new meaning for her at the age of 17, representing the need to live in the moment.

Critical reception 
Audrey Brandes of music site Sheesh Media, described the track as simultaneously haunting and melodic, stating that McRae is on track to being crowned this generations's queen of breakup ballads. Brandes further praises McRae's vocals and emotional delivery, while remarking that McRae adeptly captures the complexities arising from the uncertainties of a relationship moving too fast, doubts about the other person's feelings and ambiguity about who both parties will be in the future. Brandes also applauds the production of the song noting that, "The chorus sounds like falling into oneself, simultaneously climactic and desperate. The vocals build in intensity, ultimately layering over each other and evoking a sense of multidimensionality – all the versions of herself past, present, and future existing at once." Skope Magazine described the song as instantly relatable and showcasing, self-reflective, intimate lyrics. Sam Murphy of music site 'the interns' remarked that McRae is fast becoming the queen of the sad jam, and described the track as warped pop song with a heavy emotional backbone, noting that the emotion McRae brings to her voice adds weight to her already piercing lyrics.

Personnel 
Credits adapted from Tidal.

 Nolan Lambroza – producer, lyricist, composer
 Russell Chell – producer, lyricist, composer
 Tate McRae – lyricist, composer, associated performer
 Zack Zadek – lyricist, composer
 Zoe Moss – lyricist, composer
 Dave Cook – misc. prod.
 Dave Kutch – mastering engineer
 Eric Palmquist – mixing engineer

Live performances 
In March 2021, McRae performed the song on Jimmy Kimmel Live! The performance recreated McRae's first viral video on YouTube, initially featuring her playing the keyboard against the background from that first video, before panning over to an elaborate and immaculately lit set and once a again closing with McRae playing the keyboard.

Charts

Certifications

Release history

References 

2020s ballads
2021 singles
2021 songs
RCA Records singles
Tate McRae songs
Songs written by Tate McRae